The Ayton East Field Hoard is a hoard of Neolithic stone and antler tools from East Ayton, North Yorkshire, England.

Discovery
The hoard was excavated from a cairn in 1849 by A.D. Conyngham. A primary burial in the centre of the cairn included human remains and some stone tools. The hoard was associated with a secondary burial of a small amount of human remains in the barrow. The cairn has been radiocarbon dated to 3080 ±90 BC.

Contents
The hoard comprises three flint axes and a flint adze, five arrowheads, a polished flint knife, two flint flakes, an antler 'macehead' and two boar-tusk knives.

Acquisition
The hoard was acquired by the British Museum in 1879 from a donation by Rev William Greenwell.

References

1849 in England
1849 archaeological discoveries
History of North Yorkshire
Archaeological sites in North Yorkshire
Neolithic England
Prehistoric objects in the British Museum